Kamyshin is a city in Volgograd Oblast, Russia, located on the right bank of the Volgograd Reservoir of the Volga River, in the estuary of the Kamyshinka River. Its population was  Past populations for Kamyshin include

History
It was founded in 1667 on the left bank of the Kamyshinka River. In 1710, all of its inhabitants were relocated to the fortress of Dmitriyevsk on the opposite bank of the river. In 1780, the name was changed to Kamyshin and it was granted town status. In the 19th century, Kamyshin turned into a merchant city with sawmills and windmills. It was formerly famous for its watermelon trade.

Portage between the Volga and Don Rivers

Near Kamyshin, the Volga is quite close——to the upper reaches of the Ilovlya River, the tributary of the Don. In this place in ancient times there existed a portage ("volok") many times used by the troops invading the land of the Khazars, and moving from the Don basin to the Volga. In the 16th century, the Turkish Sultan Selim II attempted to build a canal here. A similar effort was later made by Peter the Great who built the fort, originally named Petrovsk, to protect workmen during the (unfinished) construction of the canal.

Administrative and municipal status
Within the framework of administrative divisions, Kamyshin serves as the administrative center of Kamyshinsky District, even though it is not a part of it. As an administrative division, it is incorporated separately as the city of oblast significance of Kamyshin—an administrative unit with the status equal to that of the districts. As a municipal division, the city of oblast significance of Kamyshin is incorporated as Kamyshin Urban Okrug.

Climate
The city lies within the humid continental climate (Köppen: Dfa) zone, and experiences four distinct seasons.

Sports
FC Tekstilshchik Kamyshin now plays in Russian Second Division; however, in 1992-1996 the club played in the top tier of Russian association football, achieving fourth place in 1993. This was followed by the campaign in the UEFA Cup where Tekstilshchik reached the second round.

Miscellaneous

Notable people
Alexey Maresyev, flying ace
Pavel Smurov, former Russian professional footballer

Sister city
 Opava, Czech Republic

References

Notes

Sources

External links

Official website of Kamyshin 
Kamyshin Business Directory  

Cities and towns in Volgograd Oblast
Kamyshinsky Uyezd
Populated places on the Volga
Populated places established in 1667
1667 establishments in Russia